MAG Interactive is a Swedish mobile game developer and publisher founded in 2010 by Daniel Hasselberg, Roger Skagervall, Kaj Nygren, Johan Persson, Fredrik Stenh and Anders Larsson. Best known for its debut word game Ruzzle, and quiz game QuizDuel, MAG Interactive focuses on the casual games market by developing and acquiring social and educational based games for iOS, Android.

History 
Founding

Before creating MAG interactive, founders Daniel Hasselberg and Kaj Nygren met in 1999 while working at an Ericsson research lab. Together with mutual friend Roger Skagervall, they created a small company called "Connect Things". From that company, the three entrepreneurs went on to create "Mobile Access Group Sweden AB" in 2003, which originally focused on music streaming platforms. With the addition of Anders Larsson, Frederik Stenh and Johan Persson, Mobile Access Group Sweden AB transitioned into app development consulting in 2008. Four years later in 2012, the now named MAG Interactive, released their first proprietary game onto the Swedish market . The word play based game was called "Rumble" and went on to be re-named "Ruzzle",  it is the cornerstone of MAG's game line up. From that point on MAG acquired many other social game concepts, including "Word Brain" and QuizDuel.

Acquiring Delinquent

In 2015 MAG Interactive acquired UK-based development studio Delinquent, increasing their staff number to 50 people. Their first joint project was a free-to-play match-3 game, Potion Pop , which successfully received millions of downloads.

Acquiring FEO Media and IPO 

In 2017, MAG Interactive underwent some structural changes as a company. The first being the October acquisition of Swedish game studio FEO Media, maker of QuizDuel. In addition to the acquisition, MAG Interactive became a publicly traded company on December 8, with its listing on NASDAQ First North.

Acquiring Sventertainment

August 2020 MAG Interactive announced the acquisition of Swedish media company Sventertainment AB, maker of the live trivia app PrimeTime, for 20 million SEK.

Acquiring Apprope

December 2020, MAG Interactive announced the acquisition of Swedish game studio Apprope through an initial cash purchase price of 50 million SEK. Founded in 2012 by Daniel Lodin and Markus Wedenborn, Apprope is a maker of casual mobile games for iOS & Android including titles such as WordBubbles and Word Mansion.

Awards 
Tech 5 2014 - Jury Prize

Hit Bolagen 2014 - #1

Deloitte Fast 50. 2015 - #7 Growth rate 929% between 2011-2014

Deloitte Fast 50 2016 - #17 Growth rate 688% between 2012-2015 

Inc 5000 2017 - #914

Games 
In 2012 MAG Interactive published its first mobile game Ruzzle, other games created by MAG Interactive include Wordzee, Word Domination, New QuizDuel, PaintHit, WordBrain, WordBrain 2, PotionPop, Wordalot, Wordalot Express, QuizCross, and Ruzzle Adventure. Each game has a multi-million player base that collectively reached 350+ million downloads as of 2020.

List of Games Developed/Published by MAG Interactive

References

Video game companies of Sweden